Miss Teen USA 1995, the 13th Miss Teen USA pageant, was televised live from the Century II Convention Center in Wichita, Kansas on 15 August 1995.  At the conclusion of the final competition, Keylee Sue Sanders of Kansas was crowned by outgoing queen Shauna Gambill of California.

The pageant was hosted by Bob Goen for the second year, with color commentary by Maty Monfort and entertainment by All-4-One.  This was the only year that the pageant was held in Wichita, which also held the Miss USA pageant from 1990 to 1994, and it was the first time that a delegate won the Miss Teen USA title in her home state.

Results

Placements

Semifinal scores

Special awards

Delegates
The Miss Teen USA 1995 delegates were:

 Alabama - Jennifer Otts
 Alaska - Heather Evans
 Arizona - Brandy Leigh Campbell
 Arkansas - Natalie Fisher
 California - Kellie Foster Moore
 Colorado - Melissa Schuster
 Connecticut - Tiffany-Anne Kosma
 Delaware - Dawn Renee Huey
 District of Columbia - Michelle Wright
 Florida - Corinna Clark
 Georgia - Gillian Nicholson
 Hawaii - Sara Kirby
 Idaho - Amy Jo Ambrose
 Illinois - Anne-Marie Dixon
 Indiana - Sarah McClary
 Iowa - Chelsey Ridge
 Kansas - Keylee Sue Sanders
 Kentucky - Brittany Johnson
 Louisiana - Shawn Elizabeth Price
 Maine - Katie Aselton
 Maryland - Jennifer Ritz
 Massachusetts - Erika Ewald
 Michigan - Kathleen McConnell
 Minnesota - Michelle Borg
 Mississippi - Meredith Joy Cash
 Missouri - Melana Scantlin
 Montana - Christi Hanson
 Nebraska - Marlo McVea
 Nevada - Alicia Carnes
 New Hampshire - Denise Courtney Hill
 New Jersey - Joyce Houseknecht
 New Mexico - Shelby Phillips
 New York -  Tara Campbell
 North Carolina - Meredith Jackson
 North Dakota - Jessica Spier
 Ohio - Amber Vaughan
 Oklahoma - Shelly Forest
 Oregon - Kirra O'Brien
 Pennsylvania - Erika Lynn Shay
 Rhode Island - Carol Pedrosa
 South Carolina - Garianne Phillips
 South Dakota - Marty Eaton
 Tennessee - Lynnette Cole
 Texas - Mandy Jeffreys
 Utah - Loni Sorden
 Vermont - Melissa Perron
 Virginia - Kristel Jenkins
 Washington - Summer Springer
 West Virginia - Sarah Russell
 Wisconsin - Rebecca Rowe
 Wyoming - Erica Lynn Williams

Preliminary scores
The following is the contestants average scores in the preliminary competition.

Historical significance 
 Kansas wins competition for the first time. Also becoming in the 12th state who wins Miss Teen USA.
 Maine earns the 1st runner-up position for the first time and reached its highest placement ever at the pageant.
 Utah earns the 2nd runner-up position for the first time and reached its highest placement ever at the pageant.
 Delaware finishes as Top 6  for the first time.
 Illinois finishes as Top 6  for the first time.
 Tennessee finishes as Top 6 for the second time and repeats the same position as the last year.
 States that placed in semifinals the previous year were California, Florida, Kansas, Missouri and Tennessee.
 Tennessee placed for the third consecutive year.
 California, Florida, Kansas and Missouri made their second consecutive placement.
 Maine last placed in 1993.
 Illinois and Iowa last placed in 1992.
 Kentucky last placed in 1990.
 Delaware placed for the first time.
 Minnesota placed for the first time.
 Utah placed for the first time.
 Georgia, Pennsylvania and South Carolina break an ongoing streak of placements since 1993.
 Indiana breaks an ongoing streak of placements since 1991.

Crossovers
Contestants who later competed in the Miss USA pageant were:
Anne-Marie Dixon (Illinois) - Miss Oklahoma USA 1998
Amy Jo Ambrose (Idaho) - Miss Idaho USA 1999
Alicia Carnes (Nevada) - Miss Nevada USA 2000
Lynnette Cole (Tennessee) - Miss Tennessee USA and Miss USA 2000
Kristel Jenkins (Virginia) - Miss Virginia USA 2001
Sarah McClary (Indiana) - Miss Indiana USA 2001
Melana Scantlin (Missouri) - Miss Missouri USA 2002
Michelle Wright (District of Columbia) - Miss District of Columbia USA 2003
Katie Aselton, first runner-up, became an actress.  She is well known for her role of Jenny McArthur on The League, and has also appeared in The Puffy Chair and the fifth season of Undressed.
Jessica Spier (North Dakota) is the younger sister of Juliette Spier, Miss North Dakota Teen USA 1992.  Juliette would go on to win Miss North Dakota USA 1996.

Judges
Lisa Akey
Allison Brown Young
Clarence Gilyard
Brian McNamara
Adam Oates
Lisa Santos
Raphael Sbarge
David Sidoni
Laurin Sydney

References

External links
Official website

1995
1995 beauty pageants
1995 in the United States
1995 in Kansas